Allen Township may refer to:

Illinois
 Allen Township, LaSalle County, Illinois

Indiana
 Allen Township, Miami County, Indiana
 Allen Township, Noble County, Indiana

Iowa
 Allen Township, Harrison County, Iowa
 Allen Township, Polk County, Iowa
 Allen Township, Warren County, Iowa

Kansas
 Allen Township, Jewell County, Kansas
 Allen Township, Kingman County, Kansas

Michigan
 Allen Township, Michigan

Missouri
 Allen Township, Worth County, Missouri

North Dakota
 Allen Township, Kidder County, North Dakota, in Kidder County, North Dakota

Ohio
 Allen Township, Darke County, Ohio
 Allen Township, Hancock County, Ohio
 Allen Township, Ottawa County, Ohio
 Allen Township, Union County, Ohio

Pennsylvania
 Allen Township, Northampton County, Pennsylvania

South Dakota
 Allen Township, Beadle County, South Dakota, in Beadle County, South Dakota

Township name disambiguation pages